James Dover Grant  (born 29 October 1954), primarily known by his pen name Lee Child, is a British author who writes thriller novels, and is best known for his Jack Reacher novel series. The books follow the adventures of a former American military policeman, Jack Reacher, who wanders the United States. His first novel, Killing Floor (1997), won both the Anthony Award and the Barry Award for Best First Novel.

Early life and education
Grant was born in Coventry. His Northern Irish father, who was born in Belfast, was a civil servant who lived in the house where the singer Van Morrison was later born. He is the second of four sons; his younger brother, Andrew Grant, is also a thriller novelist. Grant's family relocated to Handsworth Wood in Birmingham when he was four years old so that the boys could receive a better education. Grant attended Cherry Orchard Primary School in Handsworth Wood until the age of 11. He attended King Edward's School, Birmingham.

In 1974, at the age of 20, Grant studied law at University of Sheffield, though he had no intention of entering the legal profession and, during his student days, worked backstage in a theatre. After graduating, he worked in commercial television. He received a Bachelor of Laws (LLB) degree from the University of Sheffield in 1977 and returned to the university to receive an honorary Doctor of Letters (DLitt) in 2009.

Career

Television production career

Grant joined Granada Television, part of the UK's ITV Network, in Manchester as a presentation director. There he was involved with shows including Brideshead Revisited, The Jewel in the Crown, Prime Suspect, and Cracker. Grant was involved in the transmission of more than 40,000 hours of programming for Granada, writing thousands of commercials and news stories. He worked at Granada from 1977 to 1995 and ended his career there with two years as a trade union shop steward.

Writing career
After being made redundant from his job because of corporate restructuring, Grant decided to start writing novels, stating they are "the purest form of entertainment." In 1997, his first novel, Killing Floor, was published, and he moved to the United States in the summer of 1998. He starts each new book of the series on an anniversary of his starting the first book after losing his job.

His pen name "Lee" comes from a family joke about a heard mispronunciation of the name of Renault's Le Car, as "Lee Car". Calling anything "Lee" became a family gag. His daughter, Ruth, was "lee child".

"Child" places his books alphabetically on bookshop and library shelves between crime fiction greats Raymond Chandler and Agatha Christie. Grant has said that he chose the name Reacher for the central character in his novels because he himself is tall and when they were grocery shopping his wife Jane remarked: "'Hey, if this writing thing doesn't pan out, you could always be a reacher in a supermarket.' ... 'I thought, Reacher – good name.'"

Some books in the Jack Reacher series are written in the first person, while others are written in the third person.  Grant has characterised the books as revenge stories – "Somebody does a very bad thing, and Reacher takes revenge" – driven by his anger at the downsizing at Granada. Although English, he deliberately chose to write American-style thrillers.
In 2007, Grant collaborated with 14 other writers to create the 17-part serial thriller The Chopin Manuscript, narrated by Alfred Molina. This was broadcast weekly on Audible.com between 25 September 2007 and 13 November 2007.

On 30 June 2008, it was announced that Grant would be taking up a Visiting Professorship at the University of Sheffield from November 2008.  In 2009, Grant funded 52 Jack Reacher scholarships for students at the university.

Grant was elected president of the Mystery Writers of America in 2009. Grant was the Programming Chair for the Theakstons Old Peculier Crime Writing Festival in 2018, part of the Harrogate International Festivals portfolio.

In 2019, it was announced that Child would be curating a new TV show called Lee Child: True Crime. The show will dramatise real-life crime stories from around the world and focus on average people who go to extraordinary lengths to fight crime or seek justice.

In January 2020, Child announced that he would be retiring from writing the Jack Reacher book series, and hand it to his brother Andrew Grant, who would write further books of the series under the surname Child. He intended to write the next few books together with Grant before passing the series entirely over to him.

Writing style
Grant's prose has been described as "hardboiled" and "commercial" in style. A 2012 interview suggested that many aspects of the Jack Reacher novels were deliberately aimed at maintaining the books' profitability, rather than for literary reasons. For instance, making Jack Reacher have one parent who was French was suggested as being partly because the presence of only American members of Reacher's family would limit the series's appeal in France. The same interview stated that Grant "didn't apologise about the commercial nature" of his fiction.

Other activities
In 2019, Child collaborated with musicians Jennifer and Scott Smith of the group Naked Blue on an album of music "exploring their favourite character, Jack Reacher, in song."  He contributed a vocal to track #5, "Reacher Said Nothing."

In 2020 Child joined the Booker Prize judging panel, alongside Margaret Busby (chair), Sameer Rahim, Lemn Sissay and Emily Wilson.

Philanthropy
In January 2012, Grant donated £10,000 towards a new vehicle for Brecon Mountain Rescue Team in Wales. His brother is a senior member of the team. The team's former control vehicle was written off after a collision in 2011.

Grant is an annual sponsor and original member of ThrillerFest.

Personal life
Grant married his wife Jane in 1975 and moved to the United States in the summer of 1998. Since then, they have resided in New York state. They have a daughter, Ruth.

Grant is a fan of Aston Villa Football Club and has been known to include the names of Aston Villa players in his books.

In 2013, the Daily Mail quoted Grant saying that he writes while intoxicated ("high") by cannabis. However, in a phone interview in November 2013, he clarified his comments to the Irish Examiner, saying he's never written while high. "Yeah, that's true", Child told The Post-Standard. "I mean, people say to me, 'There was that story in the newspaper,' and I say, 'No, that's The Daily Mail.' In Britain, that's not a newspaper, you know, that's a scandal sheet where they make stuff up. It's not very reliable. And certainly, I don't deny smoking the occasional joint, but I don't work when I'm stoned because you don't get much done that way."

Works

Novels 

Jack Reacher series:

Note: For consistency, ISBN is that of the Bantam Press (UK) hardcover, first printing only.
^ by Lee Child and Andrew Child

Non-fiction 

 The Hero, Publication: London: TLS Books, 2019 .

Short stories 

Collections:
 No Middle Name (2017), collection of two novellas and ten short stories from the Jack Reacher series:
 "Too Much Time" (novella), "Deep Down", "Everyone Talks", "Guy Walks into a Bar", "High Heat" (novella), "James Penney's New Identity" (1999 version), "Maybe They Have a Tradition", "No Room at the Motel", "Not a Drill", "Second Son", "Small Wars", "The Picture of the Lonely Diner"

Jack Reacher series:

Other short stories:
 "The Snake Eater by the Numbers", chapter six from serialized novel Like a Charm (2004, edited by Karin Slaughter)
 "Ten Keys", collected in The Cocaine Chronicles (2005, edited by Jervey Tervalon and Gary Phillips)
 "The Greatest Trick of All", collected in Greatest Hits (2005, edited by Robert J. Randisi), and in The Best British Mysteries IV (2007)
 "Safe Enough", collected in MWA Presents Death Do Us Part (2006)
 "The .50 Solution", collected in Bloodlines: A Horse Racing Anthology (2006)
 Chapter 15 from audio serialized novel The Chopin Manuscript (2007)
 "Public Transportation", collected in Phoenix Noir (2009)
 One chapter from audio serialized novel The Copper Bracelet (2009)
 Story collected in The World's Greatest Crime Writers tell the inside Story of Their Great Detectives, or The Line Up (2010), about Jack Reacher and his origins
 "Me and Mr. Rafferty", collected in The Dark End of the Street (2010, edited by Jonathan Santlofer and S. J. Rozan)
 "Section 7 (a) (Operational)", collected in Agents of Treachery (2010)
 "The Bodyguard", collected in First Thrills (2010, edited by Lee Child)
 "Addicted to Sweetness", collected in MWA Presents The Rich and the Dead (2011, edited by Nelson DeMille)
 "The Bone-Headed League", collected in A Study in Sherlock (2011)
 "I Heard a Romantic Story", collected in Love is Murder (2012)
 "The Hollywood I Remember", collected in Vengeance (2012, edited by Lee Child)
 "My First Drug Trial", collected in The Marijuana Chronicles (July 2013)
 "Wet with Rain", collected in Belfast Noir (November 2014)
 "The Truth About What Happened", collected in In Sunlight or in Shadow: Stories Inspired by the Paintings of Edward Hopper (December 2016)
 "Chapter 6: The Fortune Cookie" from the novel Anatomy of Innocence (March 2017)
 "Pierre, Lucien & Me", collected in Alive in Shape and Color (December 2017)
 "New Blank Document", collected in It Occurs to Me that I am America (January 2018)
 "Shorty and the Briefcase", collected in Ten Year Stretch (April 2018)

Adaptations 

 Jack Reacher (2012), film directed and written by Christopher McQuarrie, based on novel One Shot. An American thriller film starring Tom Cruise. Grant made a cameo appearance as a police desk sergeant in the film.
 Jack Reacher: Never Go Back (2016), film directed by Edward Zwick, and written by Richard Wenk, Zwick, and Marshall Herskovitz, based on novel Never Go Back. With Tom Cruise reprising the role. In the film, the final scene is set in New Orleans, which was not a location in the book. Grant made a cameo appearance as an airport ticket agent in the film.
 Reacher (2022), an Amazon Prime series starring Alan Ritchson. In the last episode of season 1, Grant can be seen in the last chapter as a man walking out of the diner who says "Excuse me" when passing Reacher.  Reacher then speaks to Finlay and eats a piece of peach pie.

Awards

Awards of novels

Honorary degrees 

Child has received honorary degrees from several universities. These include:

Other awards

Honours

Grant was appointed Commander of the Order of the British Empire (CBE) in the 2019 Queen's Birthday Honours List for services to literature.

References

External links

Official website, featuring Lee Child's blog, forum, bibliography and excerpts
Lee Child's books from U.S. Publisher Bantam Dell
Lee Child at the Internet Book List
Interview with Lee Child at readingandwritingpodcast.com

"Lee Child's heaven and hell", Daily Telegraph, 14 July 2007
"Lee Child on creating Jack Reacher", The Times, 25 August 2012.

1954 births
Living people
People from Coventry
English thriller writers
English crime fiction writers
People educated at King Edward's School, Birmingham
Alumni of the University of Sheffield
People from Birmingham, West Midlands
21st-century British novelists
Nero Award winners
English people of Irish descent
British people of Irish descent
Anthony Award winners
Barry Award winners
Commanders of the Order of the British Empire
Cartier Diamond Dagger winners